Huron Meadows Metropark is a park in the Huron-Clinton system of metro parks.  The park covers  along the Huron River.  It has a regulation golf course, hike-bike trails and self-guided nature trails. In the winter, the park has cross-country skiing and ice-fishing.

Gallery

References

External links
 Huron-Clinton Metroparks

Huron–Clinton Metroparks
Huron River (Michigan)
Protected areas of Livingston County, Michigan